The Mae Shi was an experimental rock band from Los Angeles, California, formed in 2002.

History
The band was formed by Tim Byron and Ezra Buchla, who had known each other for years, having spent time growing up in the Los Angeles suburb of Claremont together—Jeff Byron and Buchla were classmates at Claremont High School and close friends. Originally, Tim played guitar, Buchla played a collection of 30-year-old Buchla modules and sang, and varying drummers accompanied them. When Jeff graduated from college, he joined the band on guitar and Tim moved to bass. After a few months of practicing together, the three met Brad Breeck, who was studying at the California Institute of Arts with Buchla and had performed versions of John Zorn's "strategy game piece" Cobra in an ensemble led by Buchla. (The ensemble also featured future Mae Shi drummer Corey Fogel).

The band began performing live in 2003. They were a part of the local scene centered around The Smell.  More shows throughout Los Angeles followed, and the band gained a reputation for its high-energy performances.  Soon after, they released their first EP, To Hit Armor Class Zero, on the label Byron runs, Join Or Die. They embarked on a tour in the summer of 2003, playing shows on the West coast. In Olympia, WA, they met Kill Rock Stars/5RC founder Slim Moon, with whom they kept in touch after the show.

Through the fall of 2003 and winter of 2004, they worked on their debut LP, recording songs in their living rooms and bedrooms using borrowed gear. They sent a CD-R of the record to Moon in April 2004, and one week later in an Instant Messenger conversation, he offered to release it on Kill Rock Stars' sister label 5 Rue Christine. Terrorbird was released in July 2004, and the band embarked on a 31-day, 32-show tour to promote it, without using a booking agent. The band played with bands such as Fat Day and Rapider Than Horsepower. To promote their first LP to say thanks to their mostly Los Angeles-based fanbase, they released The Mae Shi 2004 Mixtape. The 70-minute tape collects their favorite parts from their favorite 2000 songs.

In 2005, they released an EP (titled Heartbeeps for the U.S. version released by 5RC and Go Zbra by Swedish label Deleted Art), and a split LP with Rapider Than Horsepower called Do Not Ignore the Potential on Narshardaa in Europe (released in January 2006 on Strictly Amateur Films in the U.S). They embarked on a five-week tour of Europe in May 2005 with the band Rapider Then Horsepower. Upon returning to the US in June 2005, they were named "best punk/hardcore band" in the LA Weekly's 2005 Music Awards.

In October 2005, they embarked on another US tour. Corey Fogel, who joined the band in the middle of their European tour as a mid-tour replacement for Brad Breeck when he suffered a family emergency, joined the band full-time as drummer. Breeck now plays guitar, keyboards and drums. To help fund the tour, they released two limited edition CD-Rs, I and II.

Their debut DVD, Lock The Skull, Load The Gun, was released in April 2006 on 5RC. It combined 32 music videos made by friends and fans with an hour-long tour documentary chronicling their Celebration Tour.  In July 2006, it was announced that Buchla had left the band approximately two months before. Fogel has also since left the band. Both departing members are now members of Gowns. Breeck has returned to playing the drums. It was announced in September/October 2006 that Jonathan Gray had joined the band as singer/guitarist.

Although the band decided to not play outside of their LA home after their Fall 2005 tour, they participated in a small two-week East Coast tour in August 2007 with Yea Big + Kid Static. On the tour, the band offered two limited edition CD-Rs, "III" ('HLLLYH' out-takes and demos) and IIII (Kingdom Come out-takes), along with a limited release of HLLLYH on cassette.  The same year they appeared in the film What We Do Is Secret performing as The Screamers in The Masque scene, playing a cover version of the Germs' "Sex Boy" with Rich Moreno playing the role of Tomata du Plenty.

On December 2, 2007 the band debuted Bill Gray and Marcus Savino in their live line up to replace bassist Tim Byron and drummer Brad Breeck, who will continue on with the Mae Shi, but not tour with them. With their new line up, they embarked on a 4-day West Coast tour with The Germs in late December 2007, followed by a two-week tour in the UK during January/February 2008 promoting their new album. Marcus soon left the Mae Shi, and Jacob Cooper (of Bark Bark Bark) quickly joined the crew as they prepared to tour more. They played 18 shows at SXSW (South by South-West Festival) in March 2008.

Their third release, HLLLYH, was released on the labels Moshi Moshi (UK) and Team Shi (America) on February 11, 2008. They are already working on a new EP featuring all six current members of The Mae Shi. The Mae Shi has currently been chosen as one of the "Best New Bands" of California by Boston Phoenix Annual 50 Best Bands in America.

The Grays and Cooper are now working under the name Signals, Jeff Byron leads Physical Forms (with rapper Busdriver) and Breeck performs as Skull Tape. In 2009, Byron started a band with rapper Busdriver called Physical Forms; an album is forthcoming in mid-2012.

Fanboy & Chum Chum
The Mae Shi is also known for composing music for Nickelodeon's CG-animated series, Fanboy & Chum Chum. They first recorded the theme song for the series, followed by the promotional song, and later composed musical cues for the show in some episodes, such as "Back from the Future" and "The Great Bicycle Mystery".

Discography

Singles
 "Run to Your Grave" (2008) UK Sales No. 99
 "R U Professional" (2009)

Filmography
 Lock The Skull, Load The Gun (2006)

References

External links

 Official Mae Shi Myspace
 Interview
 Interview in the OC Weekly
 Interview in Dusted Magazine
 Interview in SUPERSWEET, May 2009
 The Mae Shi has been chosen as one of the "Best New Bands" of California by Boston Phoenix Annual 50 Best Bands in America

American noise rock music groups
Indie rock musical groups from California
Kill Rock Stars
Musical groups from Los Angeles
Kill Rock Stars artists
Moshi Moshi Records artists